In the United States, the civilian noninstitutional population refers to people 16 years of age and older residing in the 50 States and the District of Columbia who are not inmates of institutions (penal, mental facilities, homes for the aged), and who are not on active duty in the Armed Forces.

Data

The data series can be obtained from the Federal Reserve Economic Database (FRED). As of September 2014, there were 248,446,000 persons in the civilian noninstitutional population  out of a U.S. population of approximately 320 million. It has steadily grown along with the U.S. population, roughly 1% per year for 2005-2013 period.

Usage
The measure is used to help gauge the percentage of the population that is employed or in the workforce, as the denominator in the "civilian employment to population ratio", also called the EM ratio, and the "civilian labor force participation rate." Trends in these figures are shown in the first graphic; the computation of these figures is shown in the second graphic.

This is calculated including those who are 16+, non-military, and are part of the non-institutional population.

See also
 Current Population Survey
 Bureau of Labor Statistics
 Unemployment in the United States

References

External links
 Civilian noninstitutional population in glossary, U.S. Bureau of Labor Statistics Division of Information Services

Macroeconomic indicators
Human rights in the United States
Workforce
Demographics of the United States